Longos may refer to:

the Greek name for Longus, author of the ancient Greek novel Daphnis and Chloe
places in Greece:
Longos, Achaea, a village in Achaea
Longos, Paxoi, a village in the island of Paxoi
Longos, Trikala, a village in the municipal unit Estiaiotida, Trikala regional unit
Sithonia, a peninsula on the Chalkidiki
places in the Philippines:
Longos, Cabangan, a village in the municipality Cabangan, Zambales, Central Luzon
Longos, Kalayaan, a village in the municipality Kalayaan, Laguna, Southern Luzon
Longos, Malabon, a village in the city Malabon, Metro Manila
Longo's, Canadian supermarket chain in the Greater Toronto and Hamilton Area
East Side Longos, Hispanic Gang

See also
Longo